The 1986 WTA German Open was a women's tennis tournament played on outdoor clay courts at the Rot-Weiss Tennis Club in West Berlin, West Germany that was part of the 1986 Virginia Slims World Championship Series. It was the 17th edition of the tournament and was held from 12 May through 18 May 1986. Second-seeded Steffi Graf won the singles title and earned $29,000 first-prize money. The tournament marked the first time that Graf defeated Martina Navratilova.

Finals

Singles
 Steffi Graf defeated  Martina Navratilova 6–2, 6–3
 It was Graf's 4th singles title of the year and of her career.

Doubles
 Steffi Graf /  Helena Suková defeated  Martina Navratilova /  Andrea Temesvári 7–5, 6–2

References

External links
 ITF tournament edition details

German Open
WTA German Open
1986 in West German sport
German